Piret is an Estonian feminine given name.

People named Piret include:
Piret, wife of Suur Tõll in Estonian mythology 
Piret Bristol (born 1968), poet, prosaist and novelist
Piret Hartman (born 1981), Estonian politician
Piret Jaaks (born 1980), writer
Piret Järvis (born 1984), singer, guitarist, and songwriter (Vanilla Ninja)
Piret Kalda (born 1966), actress 
Piret Krumm (born 1989), actress, singer, and comedian 
Piret Laurimaa (born 1971), actress
Piret Niglas (born 1968), cross-country skier
Piret Pormeister (born 1985), cross-country skier
Piret Raud (born 1971), children’s writer, illustrator and translator
Piret Viirma (born 1968), draughts player

References

Estonian feminine given names